The 1979 1. divisjon was the 35th completed season of top division football in Norway.

Overview
It was contested by 12 teams, and Viking FK won their sixth league title.

Teams and locations
Note: Table lists in un-alphabetical order.

League table

Results

Season statistics

Top scorer
 Odd Iversen, Vålerengen – 18 goals

Attendances

References
Norway - List of final tables (RSSSF)
Norsk internasjonal fotballstatistikk (NIFS)

Eliteserien seasons
Norway
Norway
1